KBRY (92.3 FM) is a radio station broadcasting a country music format. Licensed to Sargent, Nebraska, United States, the station is owned by Mark Jensen, through licensee Mid Nebraska Broadcasting, LLC.

Construction permit
In October 2012, the station, then called KHZZ, applied for a U.S. Federal Communications Commission (FCC) construction permit to move to 92.3 MHz at a new transmitter site, increasing its effective radiated power to 100,000 watts and its height above average terrain to 254 meters. It also became a commercial station. The new license was issued by the FCC on July 16, 2014.

References

External links
 Official Website
 
 FCC application

BRY
Country radio stations in the United States
Custer County, Nebraska
2008 establishments in Nebraska
Radio stations established in 2008